Salim Tuama  (born August 9, 1979) is an Arab-Israeli Palestinian Greek Orthodox footballer who plays as a midfielder for Maccabi Sha'arayim. His former clubs include Hapoel Tel Aviv, Standard Liège, Maccabi Petah Tikva, Kayserispor, Larissa, Hapoel Bnei Lod and the youth club Gadna Tel Aviv Yehuda.

An Arab citizen of Israel of Palestinian Greek Orthodox descent,  he has 13 caps for the Israel national team.

Career
Tuama has lived his life in the city of Lod, but began his career using the facilities of the Gadna club due to the poor conditions of Lod's fields and football schools.

Tuama became the hottest prospect in Israeli football in the 1998–99 season when he, along with Kfir Udi, Omri Afek, and Pini Balili, all of whom had been chosen by Israeli manager Dror Kashtan, led Hapoel to their first State Cup title since 1983, followed by a double in the next season 1999–2000.

He also played a main role in the historic appearance of Hapoel Tel Aviv in the quarter finals of the 2001–02 UEFA Cup where they were defeated by AC Milan.

At the time it was believed that Hapoel was on its way to a golden age, but Kashtan left the club in 2004 to take a break from football. By then Tuama had moved on to Maccabi Petah Tikva, where they won the Toto Cup (an event staged each year by league level for a financial prize). He received his first big break the following season by signing with the Turkish club Kayserispor (today, "Kayseri Erciyesspor"), where he filled in a disappointing season with little playing time.  At the same time his old Hapoel teammate Balili had signed with Sivasspor, a B league club he helped climb to the Süper Lig.  In the same season he returned to Maccabi Petah Tikva to help them log in perhaps their most impressive finish, second place and a ticket to the UEFA Cup.

After a disappointing 2005–06 season with Maccabi Petah Tikva, after a great start in the UEFA Cup qualifiers, he signed with Hapoel Tel Aviv. On June 28, 2007, Toama had signed a three-year contract with Standard Liège.

Tuama left Belgium after two seasons at Standard Liège, as he was injured for many parts of his second season there, and did not get many chances. He signed for Greek side Larissa and spent one season there, scoring two goals. At the end of the 2009–10 season, Tuama returned to Israel and signed, for the third time in his career, with then double holders Hapoel Tel Aviv. He scored the winning goal in a 1–0 victory over newly crowned champions Maccabi Haifa in the Israeli State Cup final of 2010–11.

International goals

Honours
 Israeli Premier League (1):
1999–00
 State Cup (5):
1999, 2000, 2007, 2011, 2012
 Toto Cup (1):
2001–02
Belgian League (2):
2007–08, 2008–09
Belgian Supercup (1):
2008
Toto Cup Leumit (1):
2014-15

References

External links
 Profile at One.co.il 
 

1979 births
Living people
Arab-Israeli footballers
Israeli Arab Christians
Israeli footballers
Israel international footballers
Israeli expatriate footballers
Gadna Tel Aviv Yehuda F.C. players
Hapoel Tel Aviv F.C. players
Maccabi Petah Tikva F.C. players
Kayserispor footballers
Standard Liège players
Athlitiki Enosi Larissa F.C. players
Hapoel Bnei Lod F.C. players
Maccabi Sha'arayim F.C. players
Süper Lig players
Israeli Premier League players
Super League Greece players
Belgian Pro League players
Liga Leumit players
Expatriate footballers in Turkey
Expatriate footballers in Greece
Expatriate footballers in Belgium
Israeli expatriate sportspeople in Belgium
Israeli expatriate sportspeople in Greece
Israeli expatriate sportspeople in Turkey
Footballers from Lod
Association football midfielders